Arthur Koh (born 1936 in British Malaya) is a Malaya footballer who plays for Selangor and Malaya national team.

Career overview
A centre-forward, Arthur was a squad player for Selangor FA that captured the 1959, 1961, 1962 and 1963 Malaysia Cup editions.

He was a squad player for Malaya that captured the 1959 and 1960 Merdeka Tournament editions.

On 3 September 1962, he was a part of the Malaya player that winning bronze medals in the 1962 Asian Games.

Honour
Selangor
Malaysia Cup: 1959, 1961, 1962, 1963

Malaya
Merdeka Cup: 1959, 1960

Sea Games: Gold medal 1961

Asian Games: Bronze medal 1962

References

Malaysian footballers
Malaysia international footballers
Association football forwards
1936 births
Living people
Selangor FA players
20th-century births